Homonota underwoodi is a species of gecko, a lizard in the family Phyllodactylidae. The species is endemic to Argentina.

Etymology
The specific name, underwoodi, is in honor of British herpetologist Garth Leon Underwood (1919–2002).

Geographic range
H. underwoodi is found in the Argentinian provinces of Catamarca, La Rioja, Mendoza, Río Negro, and San Juan.

Habitat
The preferred natural habitat of H. underwoodi is shrubland.

Reproduction
H. underwoodi is oviparous.

References

Further reading
Ávila LJ, Martinez LE, Morando M (2013). "Checklist of lizards and amphibaenians of Argentina: an update". Zootaxa 3616 (3): 201–238.
Kluge AG (1964). "A Revision of the South American Lizard Genus Homonota Gray". American Museum Novitates (2193): 1–41. (Homonota underwoodi, new species, pp. 25–28, Figure 7).
Rösler H (2000). "Kommentierte Liste der rezent, subrezent und fossil bekannten Geckotaxa (Reptilia: Gekkonomorpha)". Gekkota 2: 28–153. (Homonota underwoodi, p. 89). (in German).

Homonota
Reptiles of Argentina
Endemic fauna of Argentina
Reptiles described in 1964